Lee Doo-hyun (Hangul: 이두현; born 1980), better known by his stage name Ra.D (Hangul: 라디) is a South Korean singer, songwriter and producer who debuted in 2002 with the album My Name is Ra.D. He started his own record company, RealCollabo, and has since worked on the albums of numerous artists. He returned in February 2013 with the single "It's Been So Long" following a 6-year break.

Ra.D has produced for artists such as 2PM, Brown Eyed Girls' Gain, Dynamic Duo, KeBee, UMC, Ahn Trio and Cho PD.

On October 26, 2015, he announced RealCollabo would be closed after established for seven years. "Draw You", a collaboration project of Ra.D, d.ear, Brother Su, and Jooyoung, is the last release from this label (co-release with 24thStreet).

Discography

Studio albums

Extended plays

Singles

Collaboration singles

Soundtracks

Producer

Awards and nominations

References

1980 births
Living people
Kakao M artists
South Korean dance musicians
South Korean pop singers
South Korean rhythm and blues singers
South Korean  male  songwriters